Pudwągi  is a village in the administrative district of Gmina Reszel, within Kętrzyn County, Warmian-Masurian Voivodeship, in northern Poland.
The village has a population of 22.

References

Villages in Kętrzyn County